Hapoel Holon was an Israeli football club based in Holon. It ceased to exist in 1985 when it merged with Tzafririm Holon to form Hapoel Tzafririm Holon. In summer 2014 the club was resurrected by local businessmen.

In summer 2016 Hapoel Tzafririm Holon and F.C. Holon Yaniv merged to "Hapoel Holon" and the club refounded.

History
Founded in 1946, the club was placed in the Tel Aviv Division of Liga Meuhedet following independence in 1948.

The club was promoted to Liga Alef (then the second division) after winning Liga Bet South B division in the 1961–62 season. At the end of the 1969–70 season the club was promoted to Liga Leumit (then the top division) for the first time in their history, after winning 2–1 against Maccabi Ramat Amidar. However, they finished bottom in their first season in the top flight, and were relegated back to Liga Alef. In 1972–73 they narrowly missed out on promotion, finishing as runners-up to Bnei Yehuda. They missed out on promotion by a single place in 1978–79, but were relegated to Liga Alef at the end of the 1980–81 season. They returned to the second division at the end of the 1982–83 season after winning 3–0 against Maccabi Hadera in the Promotion play-offs.

In 1985 the club merged with Liga Alef club Tzafririm Holon to form Hapoel Tzafririm Holon.

F.C. Holon Yermiyahu

In summer 2014 local businessmen Itzik Sasson and Ofer Delian, who are also the sponsors of Ironi Holon of the Israeli Beach Soccer League, initiated the re-establishment of the club. The club was due to start the 2014–15 season in Liga Gimel. Shlomi Shlomo has been appointed as head coach.

Due to naming dispute with Hapoel Tzafririm Holon, the club registered at the Israel Football Association under the name of F.C. Holon "Yaniv" (Hebrew: מועדון כדורגל חולון יניב), Moadon Kaduregel Holon "Yaniv", lit. Football Club Holon "Yaniv" (or in short Hebrew: מ.כ. חולון יניב Mem Kaf Holon "Yaniv", lit. F.C. Holon "Yaniv").

On 20 October 2014, the club won the Israel State Cup for Liga Gimel Central division, following a victory of 2–1 against Maccabi Kiryat Ekron. The club continued its success in the 2014–15 Israel State Cup, after they eliminated on penalties two clubs from Liga Alef, Maccabi Sha'arayim and Hapoel Asi Gilboa, and qualified for the Eighth round, in which they were defeated 1–4 by Maccabi Sektzia Ma'alot-Tarshiha.

The club finished their first season as F.C. Holon Yaniv, on top of Liga Gimel Central, and won promotion to Liga Bet.

On 7 July 2016 the club merged with Hapoel Tzafririm Holon to "Hapoel Holon".

At the end of 2016–17 season, the club promoted to Liga Alef, But Tzafririm retired from the club and the club changed his name to 'F.C. Holon Yermiyahu named the former player Haim Yermiyahu who died one year before.

Current squad
 As 16 February 2022

Honours

League

Cup competitions

1Achieved by F.C. Holon Yaniv

Notable former managers
Ya'akov Hodorov
Itche Menahem

References

Holon
Tzafririm Holon F.C.
Holon
1946 establishments in Mandatory Palestine
Association football clubs established in 1946
Association football clubs disestablished in 1985
Association football clubs established in 2014
Association football clubs established in 2016
1985 disestablishments in Israel
2014 establishments in Israel
2016 establishments in Israel